Lucie Décosse (born 6 August 1981 in Chaumont) is a retired female French judoka.

Career
Décosse competed in the half-middleweight (57–63 kg) category until 2008. Thereafter, she switched to the middleweight (63–70 kg) category.  She was ranked number one in the world in both categories.

Décosse won a total of 13 medals (8 of them gold) at the Olympic Games, the World Judo Championships and the European Judo Championships. She won the most important medal of her career – the middleweight (63–70 kg) gold medal – at the 2012 Olympic Games.

Décosse retired from judo after losing her bronze medal match against South Korea's Kim Seong-Yeon at the 2013 World Judo Championships in Rio de Janeiro.

Video 
 Videos of Lucie Décosse in action (judovision.org)

References

External links

 
 
 
 
 Lucie Décosse Factfile by L'Équipe

1981 births
Living people
Olympic judoka of France
Olympic gold medalists for France
Olympic silver medalists for France
Judoka at the 2004 Summer Olympics
Judoka at the 2008 Summer Olympics
Judoka at the 2012 Summer Olympics
French female judoka
French people of French Guianan descent
Olympic medalists in judo
Medalists at the 2012 Summer Olympics
Medalists at the 2008 Summer Olympics
Officers of the Ordre national du Mérite
European champions for France
Mediterranean Games silver medalists for France
Mediterranean Games medalists in judo
Competitors at the 2001 Mediterranean Games
Competitors at the 2005 Mediterranean Games
People from Chaumont, Haute-Marne
Sportspeople from Haute-Marne
21st-century French women